The Downtown Richmond Historic District in Richmond, Kentucky is a  historic district which was listed on the National Register of Historic Places in 1976.

It includes the Madison County Courthouse, a post office, a city hall, a fire station, a bank and other buildings among its 60 contributing buildings.

It includes the Glyndon Hotel (1891), a four-story brick building.

References

External links

Historic districts on the National Register of Historic Places in Kentucky
Victorian architecture in Kentucky
National Register of Historic Places in Madison County, Kentucky
Richmond, Kentucky